The 1951–52 NBA season was the Nationals' 3rd season in the NBA.

Draft picks

Roster

Regular season

Season standings

x – clinched playoff spot

Record vs. opponents

Game log

Playoffs

|- align="center" bgcolor="#ccffcc"
| 1
| March 20
| Philadelphia
| W 102–83
| Dolph Schayes (31)
| Dolph Schayes (18)
| Seymour, Osterkorn (4)
| Onondaga War Memorial
| 1–0
|- align="center" bgcolor="#ffcccc"
| 2
| March 22
| @ Philadelphia
| L 95–100
| Osterkorn, Seymour (16)
| Schayes, Ratkovicz (12)
| Wally Osterkorn (7)
| Philadelphia Arena
| 1–1
|- align="center" bgcolor="#ccffcc"
| 3
| March 23
| Philadelphia
| W 84–73
| Red Rocha (20)
| Wally Osterkorn (12)
| Paul Seymour (4)
| Onondaga War Memorial
| 2–1
|-

|- align="center" bgcolor="#ffcccc"
| 1
| April 2
| New York
| L 85–87
| Dolph Schayes (25)
| Onondaga War Memorial
| 0–1
|- align="center" bgcolor="#ccffcc"
| 2
| April 3
| New York
| W 102–92
| Paul Seymour (21)
| Onondaga War Memorial
| 1–1
|- align="center" bgcolor="#ffcccc"
| 3
| April 5
| @ New York
| L 92–99
| Red Rocha (22)
| Madison Square Garden III
| 1–2
|- align="center" bgcolor="#ffcccc"
| 4
| April 6
| @ New York
| L 93–100
| Dolph Schayes (22)
| Madison Square Garden III
| 1–3
|-

Player statistics

Season

Playoffs

Awards and records
Dolph Schayes, All-NBA First Team

Transactions

References

See also
 1951–52 NBA season

Philadelphia 76ers seasons
Sy